Dick Deer Slayer was a professional football player who played in the early National Football League. A Native American, Dick played for the Oorang Indians during the 1922 season. The Indians were a team composed only of Native American players and based in La Rue, Ohio. The team, more notable for its halftime and pre-game shows than its playing ability, was in existence for only two seasons. Deer Slayer left the team, and the league, after playing in just two games in 1922.

External links

What's an Oorang?

Native American players of American football
Oorang Indians players